The Bull City Legacy is a member of the Tobacco Road Basketball League based in Durham, North Carolina which began play in 2014. Home games are played at the Walltown Recreation Center

2013 - 2014
The team finished their inaugural season in the TRBL in second place in the East division with a final record of 7-5.

References

External links
Bull City Legacy official website

Basketball teams in North Carolina
Basketball in Durham, North Carolina
Basketball teams established in 2014
2014 establishments in North Carolina